The flexor digitorum profundus is a muscle in the forearm of humans that flexes the fingers (also known as digits). It is considered an extrinsic hand muscle because it acts on the hand while its muscle belly is located in the forearm.

Together the flexor pollicis longus, pronator quadratus, and flexor digitorum profundus form the deep layer of ventral forearm muscles. The muscle is named .

Structure 
Flexor digitorum profundus originates in the upper 3/4 of the anterior and medial surfaces of the ulna, interosseous membrane and deep fascia of the forearm.  The muscle fans out into four tendons (one to each of the second to fifth fingers) to the palmar base of the distal phalanx.

Along with the flexor digitorum superficialis, it has long tendons that run down the arm and through the carpal tunnel and attach to the palmar side of the phalanges of the fingers.

Flexor digitorum profundus lies deep to the superficialis, but it attaches more distally. Therefore, profundus's tendons go through the tendons of superficialis, and end up attaching to the distal phalanx.  For this reason profundus is also called the perforating muscle.

The lumbricals of the hand arise from the radial side of its tendons.

Nerve supply
Flexor digitorum profundus is a composite muscle innervated by the anterior interosseous nerve and ulnar nerves.
 The medial aspect of the muscle (which flexes the 4th and 5th digit) is supplied by the ulnar nerve (C8, T1).
 The lateral aspect (which flexes the 2nd and 3rd digit) is innervated by the median nerve, specifically the anterior interosseous branch (C8, T1).
It is one of two flexor muscles that is not exclusively supplied by the median nerve (the other is flexor carpi ulnaris). In the forearm, the median nerve travels distally between the flexor digitorum superficialis and the flexor digitorum profundus.

Variation 
The tendon of the index finger often has a separate muscle belly.

Function 
Flexor digitorum profundus is a flexor of the wrist (midcarpal), metacarpophalangeal and interphalangeal joints. The lumbricals, intrinsic muscles of the hand, attach to the tendon of flexor digitorum profundus. Thus, the flexor muscle is used to aid the lumbrical muscles in their role as extensors of the interphalangeal joints. As the lumbrical muscles originate on the palmar side of the hand and attach on the dorsal aponeurosis, power is transferred from the flexor digitorum profundus muscle to fully extend the fingers as well as flex the metacarpophalangeal joints.

The tension generated by flexor digitorum profundus at the more distal joints is determined by wrist position. Flexion of the wrist causes muscle shortening at that point, reducing tension that can be generated more distally. Fingers cannot be fully flexed if the wrist is fully flexed.

Other animals 
In many primates, the FDP is fused with the flexor pollicis longus (FPL).  In great apes the belly of the FDP has a separate tendon for the FDP.  In lesser apes, both muscles have separate bellies in the forearm, but in Old World monkeys they separate in the carpal tunnel.  The lack of differentiation in the FDP musculature in baboons makes it unlikely that this monkey can control individual fingers independently.

Additional images

See also
Jersey finger, a rupture of the tendon connecting to the muscle

Notes

References 
 
  (Abstract, PubMed) (PDF , Smithsonian)

External links
 

Muscles of the upper limb